Johan, or Jan van Gool (1685–1763), was a Dutch painter and writer from The Hague, now remembered mainly as a biographer of artists from the Dutch Golden Age.

Life 

Jan van Gool was a pupil of Simon van der Does and Mattheus Terwesten. He became a member of the Confrerie Pictura in 1711. He was first regent, and then five years later became director, of the Hague Drawing School from 1720-1734. He spent most of his time in the Hague, but travelled to England twice and is recorded there in 1711. He specialized in Italianate landscapes.

He is best known today for his book of artist biographies, otherwise known as the "Nieuw Schouburg". The full title is De Nieuwe Schouburg der Nederlantsche kunstschilders en schilderessen: Waer in de Levens- en Kunstbedryven der tans levende en reets overleedene Schilders, die van Houbraken, noch eenig ander schryver, zyn aengeteekend, verhaelt worden. (The Hague, 1750). He meant this book as an update to the original "Schouwburg" written by his friend Arnold Houbraken, whose 3-volume Schouburg was written in order of birth year, ending with Adriaen van der Werff, born in 1659. Just as Houbraken before him, he starts his book with a tribute to his predecessors, most notably Karel van Mander and to Houbraken himself, noting however, that Houbraken included many insulting comments in his sketches that he felt were unnecessary. He starts with the artists that Houbraken left out, choosing for his first subjects two painters from the Hague, Jan van Ravensteyn and Adriaen Hanneman. He then proceeded to write short sketches in birth year order up to 1680, ending Volume I with Gerard Jan Palthe. In Volume II he continued from 1680 with Jan van Huysum and ended in 1700 with the brothers Bernard and Matthijs Accama.

His book contains many notes about Hague painters and the founding of the drawing academy in the Hague, where he lived and worked.

List of painters in Part I

Jan Antonisz. van Ravesteyn		p. 15
Cornelis Janssens van Ceulen		p. 22
Adriaen Hanneman		p. 24
Martinus Lengele		p. 30
Arnold van Ravesteyn		p. 31
Isaac Koedijck		p. 36
Jan Potheuck		p. 36
Abraham Lambertsz van den Tempel		p. 37
Jan Goedart		p. 41
Willem Eversdijck		p. 43
Cornelis Eversdyk		p. 43
Theodor van der Schuer		p. 44
Willem Doudijns		p. 51
Nikolaes Wieling		p. 58
Herman Verelst		p. 59
Pieter Hermansz Verelst		p. 59
Simon Pietersz Verelst		p. 59
Adriaen Cornelisz Beeldemaker		p. 63
Franciscus Carree		p. 64
Johan le Ducq		p. 65
Marcus de Bye		p. 67
Daniël Haring		p. 69
Daniel Mijtens the Younger		p. 71
Jan Weenix		p. 79
Robbert Duval (1639-1732)		p. 83
Johannes Vollevens		p. 89
Anthoni Schoonjans		p. 94

Jan Mortel		p. 99
Abraham Begeyn		p. 100
Elias Terwesten		p. 102
Theodoor Visscher		p. 104
Cornelis de Bruijn		p. 112
Jan van Call		p. 117
Jan Frans van Bloemen		p. 121
Pieter van Bloemen		p. 122
Hendrik Carré		p. 122
Michiel Carree		p. 125
Frank Pieterse Verheyden		p. 127
Arnold Houbraken		p. 131
N. Bodekker		p. 147
Jillis de Winter		p. 150
Jan Fielius		p. 151
Jacobus van der Sluis		p. 151
Bonaventura van Overbeek		p. 154
Theodorus Netscher		p. 172
Willem van Mieris		p. 191
Nikolaes Hooft		p. 204
Matheus de Meele		p. 207
Rachel Ruysch		p. 210
Matthijs Pool		p. 234
Pieter van der Werff		p. 234
Albert van Spiers		p. 242
Ottmar Elliger		p. 243
Herman Henstenburgh		p. 248
Elias van Nymeegen		p. 256
Kaspares Petro Verbruggen		p. 264
Theodor van Pee		p. 272

Adam Silo		p. 287
Frans Beeldemaker		p. 289
Jan Hendrik Brandon		p. 293
Arnold Boonen		p. 294
Jaques Parmantio		p. 294
Mattheus Terwesten		p. 309
Carel Borchaert Voet		p. 329
Alexander van Gaelen		p. 340
N. Cramer		p. 341
Jacob Christoph Le Blon		p. 342
Isaac de Moucheron		p. 362
Constantijn Netscher		p. 367
R. Bleek		p. 374
Gerard Rademaker		p. 378
Gerard Wigmana		p. 386
Nikolaas Verkolje		p. 392
Abraham Rademaker		p. 403
Anselmus Weeling		p. 409
Dirk Kint		p. 413
Jasper Boonen		p. 414
Margaretha Wulfraet		p. 415
Pieter Hardimé		p. 418
Simon Hardimé		p. 418
Jan Serin		p. 423
Coenraedt Roepel		p. 426
Jacob Campo Weyerman		p. 434
Philip van Dijk		p. 440
Henrik van Limborch		p. 448
Jan Palthe		p. 370
Gerard Jan Palthe		p. 469

List of painters in Part II

	
Jan van Huysum		p. 13
Justus van Huysum		p. 30
Jacob van Huysum		p. 30
N. Haverman		p. 32
Hendrik Hulst		p. 32
Herman van der Mijn		p. 34
Frans Dekker		p. 49
Wilhelmus Troost		p. 50
Jacoba Maria van Nickelen		p. 52
Matthijs Balen		p. 55
Abraham Torenvlied		p. 57
Johannes Vollevens II		p. 57
Balthasar Denner		p. 62
Jacques Ignatius de Roore		p. 86
Isaak Walraven		p. 116
Hieronimus van der My		p. 129
Jan Maurits Quinkhard		p. 130
Dirk Dalens		p. 134
Bartholomeus Douven		p. 136
N. Anchilus		p. 138
Robbert Griffier		p. 140
Johannes Vogelsang		p. 143
Francis Vergh		p. 145
Frans van Mieris the Elder		p. 147
Jan Abel Wassenberg		p. 152
Antoni de Waerd		p. 157
Jacob Appel (painter)		p. 158
Pieter van Call		p. 165
Jan van Call		p. 168
Jan Wandelaer		p. 169
Henriëtta van Pee		p. 179
Harmanus Wolters		p. 191
Cornelis Pronk		p. 193
Abraham de Haen		p. 198
Jan de Beijer		p. 199
Louis Fabricius Dubourg		p. 200
Gerard Melder		p. 205

Adriaen van der Burg		p. 212
Abraham Carré		p. 215
Hendrik Carré II		p. 217
Johannes Carré		p. 218
Jacob de Wit		p. 218
Jacob van Liender		p. 238
Theodoor Hartzoeker		p. 239
Cornelis Troost		p. 241
Sara Troost		p. 252
Louis de Moni		p. 259
Leonard François Louis		p. 262
Johan Hendrik Keller		p. 266
Engel Sam		p. 273
Johan Graham		p. 276
Mattheus Verheyden		p. 278
Jan George Freezen		p. 297
Antoni Elliger		p. 301
Christina Maria Elliger		p. 303
Gerard Sanders		p. 304
Johannes Antiquus		p. 307
Dionys van Nymegen		p. 318
Andreas van der Myn		p. 321
Cornelia van der Mijn		p. 321
Gerard van der Myn		p. 321
Frans van der Mijn		p. 322
George van der Mijn		p. 326
Robbert van der Myn		p. 326
Herman Diederik Cuipers		p. 327
Pierre Lyonnet		p. 330
Kornelis Greenwood		p. 338
Aert Schouman		p. 346
Tibout Regters		p. 353
Augustinus Terwesten		p. 355
Jan Verbruggen		p. 358
Arnout Rentinck		p. 361
Jan ten Compe		p. 364
Ludolf Bakhuizen		p. 366

Hendrik de Winter		p. 369
Jan Palthe		p. 370
Jacobus Buys		p. 372
Nikolaes Reyers		p. 372
Hendrik Pothoven		p. 374
Adriaen van der Werff		p. 376
Huchtenburg		p. 410
Gerard Hoet		p. 415
Carel de Moor		p. 422
Roelof Koets		p. 438
Nicolaas Piemont		p. 441
Jan van Mieris		p. 442
Jan Boeckhorst		p. 450
Domenicus van Wijnen		p. 451
Dionys Godyn		p. 454
Nikolaes van Ravestein		p. 455
Isaak van der Vinne		p. 455
Jan Vincentsz van der Vinne		p. 455
Cornelis Dusart		p. 457
Jan Vermeer van Utrecht		p. 460
Norbert van Bloemen		p. 463
Abraham Brueghel		p. 463
Jan Batist Breugel		p. 464
N. de Winter		p. 465
Jacomo van Staveren		p. 466
Jacobus de Baen		p. 466
Jan Adriaensz van Staveren		p. 466
Dirk Valkenburg		p. 477
Jacob Ochtervelt		p. 488
S. van der Hoog		p. 489
Meindert Hobbema		p. 490
Jan Wijnants		p. 490
J. Fournier		p. 492
Bernard Accama		p. 493
Matthijs Accama		p. 493

References

Nieuwe Schouburg in the Institute of Dutch History (with painter index)
Nieuwe Schouburg on Google books (Edition from 1750)

1685 births
1763 deaths
18th-century Dutch painters
18th-century Dutch male artists
Dutch male painters
Dutch art historians
Artists from The Hague
Artist authors